Negin Kavir District is a district (bakhsh) in Fahraj County, Kerman Province, Iran. At the 2006 census, its population was 17,849, in 4,159 families.  The district has no cities.  The district has one rural district (dehestan): Chahdegal Rural District.

References 

Fahraj County
Districts of Kerman Province